The slide trumpet is an early type of trumpet fitted with a movable section of telescopic tubing, similar to the slide of a trombone. Eventually, the slide trumpet evolved into the sackbut, which evolved into the modern-day trombone. The key difference between these two instruments is that the slide trumpet possesses only a single slide joint, rather than the two joints in the U-shaped slide of the sackbut or trombone. There are several types of slide trumpet of different places and eras.

Early instrument 
The slide trumpet grew out of the war trumpet as used and developed in Western and Central Europe: Don Smithers argues that the slide grew out of the detachable leadpipe, and separated the use of the trumpet as a dance instrument from the trumpet as a signaling device in war.

Renaissance slide trumpet
See: Clarion
As no instruments from this period are known to have survived, the details—and even the existence—of a Renaissance slide trumpet is a matter of some conjecture, and there continues to be some debate among scholars. Some slide trumpet designs saw use in England in the 18th century.

References

Further reading

External links

, Piffaro member Greg Ingles explains the key features of the renaissance slide trumpet.
 Flatt Trumpet
 Thomas Harper

B-flat instruments
Trumpets